Bituminous Coal Miners' Strike may refer to any of the 
following strikes:
Bituminous Coal Miners' Strike of 1894
Bituminous Coal Strike of 1974
Bituminous Coal Strike of 1977-1978